Bioproducts engineering or bioprocess engineering refers to engineering of bio-products from renewable bioresources. This pertains to the design and development of processes and technologies for the sustainable manufacture of bioproducts (materials, chemicals and energy) from renewable biological resources.

Bioproducts engineers harness the molecular building blocks of renewable resources to design, develop and manufacture environmentally friendly industrial and consumer products. From biofuels, renewable energy, and bioplastics to paper products and "green" building materials such as bio-based composites, Bioproducts engineers are developing sustainable solutions to meet the world's growing materials and energy demand. Conventional bioproducts and emerging bioproducts are two broad categories used to categorize bioproducts. Examples of conventional bio-based products include building materials, pulp and paper, and forest products. Examples of emerging bioproducts or biobased products include biofuels, bioenergy, starch-based and cellulose-based ethanol, bio-based adhesives, biochemicals, biodegradable plastics, etc. Bioproducts Engineers play a major role in the design and development of "green" products including biofuels, bioenergy, biodegradable plastics, biocomposites, building materials, paper and chemicals. Bioproducts engineers also develop energy efficient, environmentally friendly manufacturing processes for these products as well as effective end-use applications. Bioproducts engineers play a critical role in a sustainable 21st century bio-economy by using renewable resources to design, develop, and manufacture the products we use every day. The career outlook for bioproducts engineers is very bright with employment opportunities in a broad range of industries, including pulp and paper, alternative energy, renewable plastics, and other fiber, forest products, building materials and chemical-based industries.

Commonly referred to as bioprocess engineering, bioprocess engineering is a specialization of biotechnology, biological engineering, chemical engineering or of agricultural engineering. It deals with the design and development of equipment and processes for the manufacturing of products such as food, feed, pharmaceuticals, nutraceuticals, chemicals, and polymers and paper from biological materials. Bioprocees engineering is a conglomerate of mathematics, biology and industrial design, and consists of various spectrums like designing of fermentors, study of fermentors (mode of operations etc.). It also deals with studying various biotechnological processes used in industries for large scale production of biological product for optimization of yield in the end product and the quality of end product. Bio process engineering may include the work of mechanical, electrical and industrial engineers to apply principles of their disciplines to processes based on using living cells or sub component of such cells.

See also

 Biochemicals
 Biofact (biology)
 Biogas
 Biomass
 Biomass (ecology)
 Biorefining
 Bioresource engineering
 Forest
 Non-timber forest product
 Outline of forestry

Colleges and universities

University of Minnesota (Bioproducts and Biosystems Engineering)
SUNY-ESF (Bioprocess Engineering Program)
Université de Sherbrooke
UC Berkeley
Savannah Technical College
East Carolina University
Institute of Chemical Technology (ICT) Mumbai
Jadavpur University
Universidade Federal do Rio de Janeiro
Universidade Estadual do Rio Grande do Sul
University of Stellenbosch
NC State University
Virginia Tech
Washington State University
University of Washington
University of Maine

References

Further reading
 Bowyer, J.L., Ramaswamy, S. Bioenergy development: Alignment is essential, Part 1, Bioenergy Technologies Tappi Publication, January 2009, p14-17
 Bowyer, J.L., Ramaswamy, S. Bioenergy development: Alignment is essential for Bioenergy Development, Part II, Exploring possible scenarios resulting from a supply gap, and possible effects of bioenergy development in environmental quality Tappi Publication, March 2009, p16-19

External links
 U.S. DOE Biomass Program
 Energy Title (Title IX) of the Farm Security and Rural Investment Act of 2002 

Sustainable agriculture
Biotechnology
Sustainable business
Sustainable forest management